Gloria Taylor (died c. 2013) was a Canadian curler.

Awards
Northwest Ontario Sports Hall of Fame: 1994 (with all of the Heather Houston 1988 and 1989 winning team)

Teams and events

References

External links

Gloria Taylor – Curling Canada Stats Archive

2010s deaths

Curlers from Thunder Bay
Canadian women curlers
Curlers from Northern Ontario
World curling champions
Canadian women's curling champions